The Bedfordshire, Cambridgeshire and Hertfordshire Major Crime Unit is a part of the British police force. It was involved in Operation Netwing.

External links
https://web.archive.org/web/20150108112437/http://www.bedfordshire.police.uk/tackling_crime/major_crime_unit.aspx

Police units of the United Kingdom